Campylobacter jejuni is a species of pathogenic bacteria, one of the most common causes of food poisoning in Europe and in the US. The vast majority of cases occur as isolated events, not as part of recognized outbreaks. Active surveillance through the Foodborne Diseases Active Surveillance Network (FoodNet) indicates that about 20 cases are diagnosed each year for each 100,000 people in the US, while many more cases are undiagnosed or unreported; the CDC estimates a total of 1.5 million infections every year. The European Food Safety Authority reported 246,571 cases in 2018, and estimated approximately nine million cases of human campylobacteriosis per year in the European Union.

Campylobacter is a genus of bacteria that is among the most common causes of bacterial infections in humans worldwide. Campylobacter means "curved rod", deriving from the Greek kampylos (curved) and baktron (rod). Of its many species, C. jejuni is considered one of the most important from both a microbiological and public health perspective.

C. jejuni is commonly associated with poultry, and is also commonly found in animal feces. Campylobacter is a helical-shaped, non-spore-forming, Gram-negative, microaerophilic, nonfermenting motile bacterium with a single flagellum at one or both poles, which are also oxidase-positive and grow optimally at 37 to 42 °C. When exposed to atmospheric oxygen, C. jejuni is able to change into a coccal form. This species of pathogenic bacteria is one of the most common causes of human gastroenteritis in the world. Food poisoning caused by Campylobacter species can be severely debilitating, but is rarely life-threatening. It has been linked with subsequent development of Guillain–Barré syndrome, which usually develops two to three weeks after the initial illness. Individuals with recent C. jejuni infections develop Guillain-Barré syndrome at a rate of 0.3 per 1000 infections, about 100 times more often than the general population. Another chronic condition that may be associated with Campylobacter infection is reactive arthritis. Reactive arthritis is a complication strongly associated with a particular genetic make-up. That is, persons who have the human leukocyte antigen B27 (HLA-B27) are most susceptible. Most often, the symptoms of reactive arthritis will occur up to several weeks after infection.

History 
In 1886 a pediatrician, Theodor Escherich, observed Campylobacters from diarrhea samples of children. The first isolation of C. jejuni was in Brussels, Belgium, from stool samples of a patient with diarrhea.

Disease 
Campylobacteriosis is an infectious disease caused by bacteria of the genus Campylobacter. In most people who become ill with campylobacteriosis, symptoms develop within two to five days of exposure to the organism and illness typically lasts seven days following onset. Infection with C. jejuni usually results in enteritis, which is characterised by abdominal pain, diarrhea, fever, and malaise. Diarrhea itself can vary in severity from loose to bloody stools. The disease is usually self-limiting. However, it does respond to antibiotics. Severe (accompanying fevers, blood in stools) or prolonged cases may require erythromycin, azithromycin, ciprofloxacin, or norfloxacin. Fluid replacement via oral rehydration salts may be needed and intravenous fluid may be required for serious cases.  Possible complications of campylobacteriosis include Guillain–Barré syndrome and reactive arthritis.

Pathogenesis 
Studies on the pathogenesis of C. jejuni show that for this organism to cause disease, the susceptibility of the host and the relative virulence of the infecting strain are both important. Infection results from the ingestion of contaminated food or water, and the infective dose can be as low as 800 organisms. To initiate infection, the organism must penetrate the gastrointestinal mucus, which it does using its high motility and spiral shape. The bacteria must then adhere to the gut enterocytes and can then induce diarrhea by toxin release. C. jejuni releases several different toxins, mainly enterotoxin and cytotoxins, which vary from strain to strain and correlate with the severity of the enteritis (inflammation of the small intestine). During infection, levels of all immunoglobulin classes rise. Of these, IgA is the most important because it can cross the gut wall. IgA immobilises organisms, causing them to aggregate and activate complement, and also gives short-term immunity against the infecting strain of organism.  The bacteria colonize the small and large intestines, causing inflammatory diarrhea with fever.  Stools contain leukocytes and blood.  The role of toxins in pathogenesis is unclear.  C jejuni antigens that cross-react with one or more neural structures may be responsible for triggering the Guillain–Barré syndrome.

Hypoacylated lipopolysaccharide (LPS) from C. jejuni induces moderate TLR4-mediated inflammatory response in macrophages and such LPS bioactivity may eventually result in the failure of local and systemic bacterial clearance in patients.  At the same time, moderation of anti-bacterial responses may be advantageous for infected patients in clinical practice, since such an attenuated LPS may not be able to induce severe sepsis in susceptible individuals.

One of the most important virulence factor of C. jejuni are flagella. The flagellar protein FlaA has been proven to be one of the abundant proteins in the cell. Flagella are required for motility, biofilm formation, host cell interactions and host colonization. The production of flagella is energetically costly so the production must be regulated from metabolic standpoint. CsrA is a post-transcriptional regulator that regulates the expression of FlaA by binding to flaA mRNA and is able to repress its translation. CsrA mutant strains have been studied and the mutant strains exhibit dysregulation of 120-150 proteins that are included in motility, host cell adherence, host cell invasion, chemotaxis, oxidative stress resistance, respiration and amino acid and acetate metabolism. Transcriptional and post-transcriptional regulation of flagellar synthesis in C. jejuni enables proper biosynthesis of flagella and it is important for pathogenesis of this bacteria.

Other important virulence factors of C. jejuni are the ability to produce N-linked glycosylation of more than 30 proteins. These proteins are important for the bacteria colonization, adherence and invasion. C. jejuni secretes Campylobacter invasive antigens (Cia) which facilitates the motility. The bacteria produces also cytolethal distending toxins that participate in cell cycle control and induction of host cell apoptosis. C. jejuni also exploits different adaptation strategies in which the host factors seem to play a role for pathogenesis of this bacteria.

Sources 
Campylobacter jejuni is commonly associated with poultry, and it naturally colonises the digestive tract of many bird species. All types of poultry and wild birds can become colonized with Campylobacter. One study found that 30% of European starlings in farm settings in Oxfordshire, United Kingdom, were carriers of C. jejuni. It is also common in cattle, and although it is normally a harmless commensal of the gastrointestinal tract in these animals, it can cause campylobacteriosis in calves. It has also been isolated from wombat and kangaroo feces, being a cause of bushwalkers' diarrhea. Contaminated drinking water and unpasteurized milk provide an efficient means for distribution. Contaminated food is a major source of isolated infections, with incorrectly prepared meat and poultry as the primary source of the bacteria. Moreover, surveys show that 20 to 100% of retail chickens are contaminated.  This is not overly surprising, since many healthy chickens carry these bacteria in their intestinal tracts and often in high concentrations, up to 108 cfu/g. The bacteria contaminate the carcasses due to poor hygiene during the slaughter process. Several studies have shown increased concentrations of Campylobacter on the carcasses after the evisceration. Studies have investigated the chicken microbiome to understand how, why and when Campylobacter appears within the chicken gut. The impact of Industrial system production systems on the chicken gut microbiome and Campylobacter prevalence have also been investigated.

Raw milk is also a source of infections.  The bacteria are often carried by healthy cattle and by flies on farms.  Unchlorinated water may also be a source of infections.  However, properly cooking chicken, pasteurizing milk, and chlorinating drinking water kill the bacteria.  Campylobacter is not, in contrast to Salmonella, transmitted vertically into eggs and therefore humans do not get infected by consuming eggs.

Possible complications 
Local complications of Campylobacter infections occur as a result of direct spread from the gastrointestinal tract and can include cholecystitis, pancreatitis, peritonitis, and massive gastrointestinal hemorrhage. Extraintestinal manifestations of Campylobacter infection are quite rare and may include meningitis, endocarditis, septic arthritis, osteomyelitis, and neonatal sepsis.  Bacteremia is detected in <1% of patients with Campylobacter enteritis and is most likely to occur in patients who are immunocompromised or among the very young or very old. Transient bacteremia in immunocompetent hosts with C. jejuni enteritis may be more common, but not detected because most strains are rapidly cleared by the killing action of normal human serum and because blood cultures are not routinely performed for patients with acute gastrointestinal illness.

Serious systemic illness caused by Campylobacter infection rarely occurs, but can lead to sepsis and death. The case-fatality rate for Campylobacter infection is 0.05 per 1000 infections. For instance, one major possible complication that C. jejuni can cause is Guillain–Barré syndrome, which induces neuromuscular paralysis in a sizeable percentage of those who suffer from it. Over time, the paralysis is typically reversible to some extent; nonetheless, about 20% of patients with GBS are left disabled, and around 5% die. Another chronic condition that may be associated with Campylobacter infection is reactive arthritis. Reactive arthritis is a complication strongly associated with a particular genetic make-up. That is, persons who have the human leukocyte antigen B27 (HLA-B27) are most susceptible. Most often, the symptoms of reactive arthritis will occur up to several weeks after infection.

Epidemiology

Frequency

United States 
An estimated 2 million cases of Campylobacter enteritis occur annually, accounting for 5–7% of cases of gastroenteritis. Campylobacter organisms have a large animal reservoir, with up to 100% of poultry, including chickens, turkeys, and waterfowl, having asymptomatic intestinal infections. The major reservoirs of C. fetus are cattle and sheep. Nonetheless, the incidence of Campylobacter infections has been declining. Changes in the incidence of culture-confirmed Campylobacter infections have been monitored by the Foodborne Diseases Active Surveillance Network (FoodNet) since 1996. In 2010, Campylobacter incidence showed a 27% decrease compared with 1996–1998. In 2010, the incidence was 13.6 cases per 100,000 population, and this did not change significantly compared with 2006–2008.

International 
Campylbacter jejuni infections are extremely common worldwide, although exact figures are not available. New Zealand reported the highest national campylobacteriosis rate, which peaked in May 2006 at 400 per 100,000 population.

Sex 
Campylobacter is more frequently isolated in males than females, and homosexual men appear to have a higher risk of infection by atypical Campylobacter-related species such as Helicobacter cinaedi and Helicobacter fennelliae.

Age 
Campylobacter infections can occur in all age groups. Studies show a peak incidence in children younger than 1 year and in people aged 15–29 years.  The age-specific attack rate is highest in young children.  In the United States, the highest incidence of Campylobacter infection in 2010 was in children younger than 5 years and was 24.4 cases per 100,000 population,  However, the rate of fecal cultures positive for Campylobacter species is greatest in adults and older children.

Treatment 
Patients with Campylobacter infection should drink plenty of fluids as long as the diarrhea lasts to maintain hydration. Patients should also get rest. If he or she cannot drink enough fluids to prevent dehydration or if the symptoms are severe, medical help is indicated. In more severe cases, certain antibiotics can be used and can shorten the duration of symptoms if given early in the illness. Moreover, maintenance of electrolyte balance, not antibiotic treatment, is the cornerstone of treatment for Campylobacter enteritis. Indeed, most patients with this infection have a self-limited illness and do not require antibiotics at all. Nevertheless, antibiotics should be used in specific clinical circumstances. These include high fevers, bloody stools, prolonged illness (symptoms that last >1 week), pregnancy, infection with HIV, and other immunocompromised states.

Prevention 
Some simple food-handling practices can help prevent Campylobacter infections.
 Cook all poultry products thoroughly. Make sure that the meat is cooked throughout (no longer pink) and any juices run clear.
 Wash hands with soap before preparing food.
 Wash hands with soap after handling raw foods of animal origin and before touching anything else.
 Prevent cross-contamination in the kitchen by using separate cutting boards for foods of animal origin and other foods and by thoroughly cleaning all cutting boards, countertops, and utensils with soap and hot water after preparing raw food of animal origin.
 Do not drink unpasteurized milk or untreated surface water.
 Make sure that people with diarrhea, especially children, wash their hands carefully and frequently with soap to reduce the risk of spreading the infection.
 Wash hands with soap after contact with pet feces.

Genome 
The genome of C. jejuni strain NCTC11168 was published in 2000, revealing 1,641,481 base pairs (30.6% G+C) predicted to encode 1,654 proteins and 54 stable RNA species. The genome is unusual in that  virtually no insertion sequences or phage-associated sequences  and very few repeat sequences are found. One of the most striking findings in the genome was the presence of hypervariable sequences. These short homopolymeric runs of nucleotides were commonly found in genes encoding the biosynthesis or modification of surface structures, or in closely linked genes of unknown function. The apparently high rate of variation of these homopolymeric tracts may be important in the survival strategy of C. jejuni. The genome was re-annotated in 2007 updating 18.2% of product functions. Analysis also predicted the first pathogenicity island in C. jejuni amongst select strains, harbouring the bacteria's Type VI secretion system and putative cognate effectors.

Initial transposon mutagenesis screens revealed 195 essential genes, although this number is likely to go up with additional analysis.

Natural genetic transformation
C. jejuni is naturally competent for genetic transformation.  Natural genetic transformation is a sexual process involving DNA transfer from one bacterium to another through the intervening medium, and the integration of the donor sequence into the recipient genome by homologous recombination.  C. jejuni freely takes up foreign DNA harboring genetic information responsible for antibiotic resistance.  Antibiotic resistance genes are more frequently transferred in biofilms than between planktonic cells (single cells that float in liquid media).

DNA repair

In the intestinal environment, bile functions as a defensive barrier against colonization by C. jejuni. When C. jejuni is grown in a medium containing the bile acid deoxycholic acid, a component of bile, the DNA of C. jejuni is damaged by a process involving oxidative stress.  To survive, C. jejuni cells repair this DNA damage by a system employing proteins AddA and AddB that are needed for repair of DNA double-strand breaks.

Laboratory characteristics 

Under light microscopy, C. jejuni has a characteristic "sea-gull" shape as a consequence of its helical form. Campylobacter is grown on specially selective "CAMP" agar plates at 42 °C, the normal avian body temperature, rather than at 37 °C, the temperature at which most other pathogenic bacteria are grown. Since the colonies are oxidase positive, they usually only grow in scanty amounts on the plates. Microaerophilic conditions are required for luxurious growth. A selective blood agar medium (Skirrow's medium) can be used. Greater selectivity can be gained with an infusion of a cocktail of antibiotics: vancomycin, polymixin-B, trimethoprim, and actidione ([Preston's agar]), and growth under microaerophilic conditions at 42 °C.

See also 
 Campylobacteriosis

References

External links 
 Campylobacter jejuni genomes and related information at PATRIC, a Bioinformatics Resource Center funded by NIAID
 Current research on Campylobacter jejuni at the Norwich Research Park
 Type strain of Campylobacter jejuni at BacDive -  the Bacterial Diversity Metadatabase

Campylobacterota
Bacteria described in 1931